Cacoxenus indagator is a species of fruit fly. It is a kleptoparasite, laying its eggs in the pollen-filled nest cells of mason bees. On account of its ability to break out of those cells once hatched, it is commonly known as the Houdini fly.

References 

Drosophilidae
Parasites of bees
Insects described in 1858